Mother's boy, mummy's boy or mama's boy is a man excessively attached to his mother. 

The term may also refer to:

Films:
Mother's Boy (1913 film)
Mother's Boy (1929 film)
Mother's Boys, a 1994 thriller film featuring Jamie Lee Curtis
Mama's Boy, a 2007 comedy starring Diane Keaton
Mamaboy, a 2016 film starring Gary Busey

In music:
Mama's Boys, a hard rock/heavy metal band from Northern Ireland
"Mama's Boy (Suzi Quatro song)", a track from Suzi Quatro's 1979 album Suzi...and Other Four Letter Words, which was also issued as a single called "Mama's Boy" in 1980
"Mama's Boy", a track from the 1984 Ramones' album Too Tough to Die

Plays
Mother's Boy, a 1964 play by Sewell Stokes

In print:
Mummy's Boy, a British comic strip
Mama's Boy, debut novella by Fran Friel